Dover Bluff is an unincorporated community in Camden County, in the U.S. state of Georgia.

History
The community most likely was named after the White Cliffs of Dover, in England.

References

Unincorporated communities in Camden County, Georgia